Darshana Land Port, is a land port of Bangladesh located in Darshana of Damurhuda Upazila in the Chuadanga District. This port is used to export-import good with India through Darshana-Gede border. This port is governed by Bangladesh Land Port Authority. Darshana land port is the first entrance point for trains to Calcutta, India.

References 

Government agencies of Bangladesh
Organisations based in Khulna